The 1992 Segunda División de Chile was the 41st season of the Segunda División de Chile.

Provincial Osorno was the tournament's champion.

Aggregate table

See also
Chilean football league system

References

External links
 RSSSF 1992

Segunda División de Chile (1952–1995) seasons
Primera B
1992 in South American football leagues